Drad may refer to:
 drad, short for decirad, a unit equal to 10 rads
 DraD, a class of bacterial adhesins

DRAD may refer to:
 DRAD, or EFEMP1, a protein
 Defending Rights & Dissent

See also 
 Drat (disambiguation)
 Dard (disambiguation)